LIJ or Lij may refer to:

 Laj, West Azerbaijan (also Līj), an Iranian village in Mokriyan-e Sharqi Rural District
 Ligurian language (ISO 639-3 code: lij), a Gallo-Italic language spoken primarily in the territories of the former Republic of Genoa
 Lij, a title of the Ethiopian aristocracy and court
 Long Island Jewish Medical Center, a clinical and academic hospital within the Northwell Health system
 Los Ingobernables de Japon, a Japanese professional wrestling stable